Based in southwest Ohio, the Eastern Corridor Program is a regional effort that integrates roadway network improvements, new rail transit, expanded bus service, bikeways and walking paths to improve travel and access between Greater Cincinnati's eastern communities and its central employment, economic and social centers.  The Program is designed to address the long-standing transportation needs of the region and to provide additional opportunity for community enhancement, economic development and regional growth.

Currently in the second phase of study and development, the Program is divided into four core projects:  improvements to the Red Bank corridor; relocation of the western terminus of State Route 32 to a new, direct link with US 50 (Columbia Parkway), the Red Bank business corridor and I-71; improvements to State Route 32 in the Eastgate area in western Clermont County; and the Oasis Rail Transit project.

The Oasis rail component is first of several proposed commuter rail lines being developed by SORTA, Hamilton County and Cincinnati in the Greater Cincinnati metro area in conjunction with proposed Light Rail and Streetcar lines.  The plan currently calls for using and upgrading existing rail lines and using rail cars powered by modern diesel multiple unit (DMUs) technology. Cincinnati hasn't had commuter rail since the early 1930s.

Initial Corridor
The Oasis Rail Transit project is the first proposed leg of a new regional rail system that will provide a new and much-needed transportation alternative for area residents. The Oasis line would span  between the Riverfront Transit Center in downtown Cincinnati in The Banks area and run east along a combination of existing and new tracks to Milford. After completing the Oasis Line, SORTA plans to create the Wasson Line.

Proposed stations
Original proposals for the Eastern Corridor includes ten stations:
 Riverfront Transit Center 
 East Riverfront
 East Walnut Hills
 Columbia-Tusculum
 Lunken Airport 
 Linwood
 Fairfax-Mariemont
 Newtown
 Broadwell Rd.
 Milford
The original Pennsylvania Railroad commuter line had stations in Clare, Plainville, and Terrace Park. It previously extended to Morrow.

Further expansion
In addition to the Eastern Corridor initial proposals define two other commuter rail corridors: one running west from downtown Cincinnati through Delhi and Cleves to Lawrenceburg, Indiana, (ex-Baltimore & Ohio to Aurora and Harrison) and the other (ex-New York Central) running north through West Chester, Middletown, to Dayton.

Criticism
In November 2012, citizens of the Mariemont community and Hamilton County publicly objected to the State Route 32 relocation project, one part of the Eastern Corridor Program. Residents of the Mariemont area were outraged when they heard that a corridor under consideration for the relocated SR32 could impact community gardens and parks along the banks of the Little Miami River. The project has also had difficulty starting due to an unusually high budget. The original estimated operating cost of the highway was $18.9 million a year. Currently, the Eastern Corridor Project is in Tier 2 of the planning phase. On 22 January 2013, a community wide meeting was held in Mariemont Village to discuss the status of the State Route 32 Relocation project, as well as objections to the project's proposed routing through Mariemont's South 80 Trails and Community Gardens park. Some of the arguments against the project that were brought up at the meeting were the adverse effects of building a highway through part of historic Mariemont, designated a National Historic Landmark since 2007, as well as ODOT's (Ohio Department of Transportation) failure to take into account the village's National Historic Landmark status, and the boundaries of the protected area, when conducting initial planning; the threat to Native American burial grounds and un-excavated archaeological sites along the proposed routing, the threats of air, sound, and noise pollution that would result from the construction and use of a major highway so close to the village, and threats to the Little Miami River, one of only 156 rivers in the US designated a National Wild and Scenic River.

References

External links
 Eastern Corridor
 SORTA official website

Passenger rail transportation in Cincinnati
Commuter rail in the United States
Proposed railway lines in Ohio